Island Saver is a free-to-play action-adventure game developed by Scottish
studio Stormcloud Games and published by National Westminster Bank. It was released on Microsoft Windows, Nintendo Switch, PlayStation 4 and Xbox One on 13 May 2020.

Gameplay 
The game's objective is to traverse an island. New areas can be unlocked by spending in-game coins. These coins are obtained by cleaning up litter, cleaning up goop and in turn saving the bankimals—animals that can balloon up with coins like a piggy bank. As the game progresses, the player learns about the fundamentals of using a bank account, in addition to related topics such as the concept of paying taxes. Two downloadable expansions are available with the proceeds going towards the charities SpecialEffect and Young Money.

Development 
NatWest aimed to create an educational video game to teach children about managing money responsibly.

Reception 
The game received a positive review from TheXBoxHub, with a 3.5/5 rating, and the reviewer commented "it plays well, looks all cute and cuddly, teaches kids about money and it’s free to download." Gamespew praised the educational elements of the game, "How exactly does Island Saver teach children about money? Well, every action you complete has a clear reward. [...] It’s about balancing your earning vs spending, and not going too mad on those non-essential purchases." Gamepitt gave the game a 9/10 rating and was also positive with regards to the graphics and educational elements.

Other reviews were critical of the game; Evan Norris of VGChartz wrote "Island Saver is not a good game but, considering its raison d'être, it could be worse." He criticised the platforming and combat features of the game, describing the latter as a 'chore' and the controls as 'clumsy'. Jonjo Cosgrove also criticised the gameplay and called it 'tedious' and closed with the comment "[Island Saver is a] thoughtful game with little to no staying value beyond an initial play." A review on TheXboxHub lamented the game's lack of a two-player option and said that the game "does get repetitive after a while".

Related media 
Tie-in activity sheets were added to MoneySense section of NatWest's website.

References

External links 

 Official website

2020 video games
Action-adventure games
Single-player video games
Windows games
Xbox One games
PlayStation 4 games
Nintendo Switch games
Educational games
Video games developed in the United Kingdom
Video games set on fictional islands
Free-to-play video games
NatWest Group